Qafë Botë is a mountain pass through the Albanian mountains along the border between Albania and Greece. In this place is situated a border crossing point between the two countries.

References 

Mountain passes of Albania
Albania–Greece border crossings